Laura Weissbecker (born October 3, 1984) is an international multilingual French and American actress, comedian, writer and producer. She is the recipient of numerous awards, including the Chinese Huading award for best new actress in 2013 for her role in Jackie Chan's CZ12. She has worked in France, Germany, USA and China, with directors such as Jackie Chan, Cedric Klapisch, Elie Chouraqui, Mark Romanek and Tonie Marshall. Weissbecker was handpicked by Jackie Chan for one of the leading roles in the film Chinese Zodiac 12, starring and directed by Jackie Chan. The film was a huge commercial success in Asia, in particular in mainland China where it is listed as amongst the top 5 biggest box-office hits for a Chinese movie in the country's history.

Personal life 
Weissbecker grew up in the east of France, in the city of Strasbourg, surrounded by a very heteroclite and European environment. She has a brother and a sister, who is a solo aerial artist with Cirque du Soleil.

Film career 

Weissbecker began her film career in 2002, when director Tonie Marshall (winner of the 2000 Cesar French Academy Award for best film, best director and best screenwriter) offered her a small role opposite Francois Cluzet in her feature film ‘’France Boutique’’.

In France, Weissbecker is best known for her role in ‘’Versailles, the Dream of a King’’ directed by Thierry Binisti, a high profile TV movie which aired on France 2, Japan (NHK) and UK (BBC), and her role in ‘’Russian Dolls" directed by Cedric Klapisch (also starring Audrey Tautou, Romain Duris, Cecile de France) .

A multilingual actress, Weissbecker was featured in a German TV movie ‘’Achtung Arzt’’ directed by German TV director Rolf Silber, which was shot in Berlin.

She shows her comedic talent starring opposite Jackie Chan in ‘’Chinese Zodiac 12,’’ an international feature film directed by Chan. Weissbecker was awarded ‘’Best New Global Actress’’ at the Chinese Huading awards in Macao in October 2013 for her performance.

In the US, she had a recurring role in the Amazon-Sony TV series "Mad Dogs".

In 2019, she studied boxing and MMA for a role in the Chinese movie "My Hero" directed by Fan Haolun. Weissbecker was awarded Best Supporting Actress at the Vancouver Chinese Film festival for this role.

She also played in Mandarin and French in the movie "the Pink Thief" directed by Mustafa Ozgun.

During the COVID-19 pandemic, Weissbecker has written several comedy sketches in which she executes a parody of Melania Trump.

In 2022, she was in the movie Covid 19 Ground Zero based on the true story of hospital workers in New York City.

Books 
Weissbecker's first book, a memoir entitled "How I became Chinese" was published in France end of 2016; the press on the book was dithyrambic, and the book won numerous awards, including the Prix du Lys. The book was translated into mandarin and published in China end of 2018 under the title "Studying to become Chinese"

Education 
Weissbecker has a master's degree from one of the top engineering schools in France. She was trained in Los Angeles with leading acting coach Howard Fine and studied as well with Larry Moss, Jack Waltzer and comedy master Gary Austin, founder of the Groundlings, the legendary improvisation troupe. Weissbecker is fluent in French, English, Chinese and German.

Awards 
Weissbecker has been part of the jury of Shanghai film festival 2013.

Laura won the Best Emerging Global Actress of Huading Awards. Nicole Kidman won the Best Global Actress award at the same Huading Awards ceremony.

The 10th Huading Awards Global Entertainment Celebrities Satisfaction Survey Release Ceremony, hosted by Global Talents Media Group and Macao Foundation, was held on 7 October 2013 (Monday) in Macao, China. Great congratulation that Laura has nominated for the "Best Emerging Global Actress" of 10th Huading Awards, and she attended the ceremony where she received her first Chinese award and gave her acceptance speech in Chinese.

References

External links 

 http://www.lauraweissbecker.com
 
 https://web.archive.org/web/20130924043901/http://www.karismo.de/199/Laura-Weissbecker.html

1984 births
Living people
Actors from Strasbourg
French film actresses
French television actresses
21st-century French actresses
French people of German descent